The South African Hockey Association (SAHA) is the governing body of field hockey in South Africa. It is affiliated to FIH International Hockey Federation and AHF African Hockey Federation. The Head Office of SAHA is in Illovo, Johannesburg, South Africa.

History
Established in August 1992 when five major hockey bodies formed one non-racial, unified body which controls and regulates hockey for men and women in South Africa. The unification brought together the South African Men's and Women's Hockey Associations, the Men's and Women's Hockey Congress and the South African Women's Hockey Board.

SAHA clubs/provinces

Below is the list of provinces/clubs that participate in various SAHA tournaments:
Eastern Province
Eastern Province Hockey Federation
Border Hockey Association
Gauteng Province
Eastern Gauteng Hockey Association
Northerns Blues Hockey Association (just "Northerns")
South Gauteng Hockey Association 
Free State Province
Free State
Northern Free State
KwaZulu-Natal
KwaZulu-Natal Coastal
KwaZulu-Natal Inland
Western Cape Province
Boland
Eden Hockey Southern Cape
Western Province Hockey Union
Limpopo
Mpumalanga
North West
Northern Cape

Affiliates
PSI Indoor Hockey
South African Schools Hockey Association (SASHOC)
 SA Masters Hockey
 University Sports South Africa

SAHA tournaments

Outdoor
Major
Premier Hockey League
Inter-Provincial Tournament (M & W)
SA Country Districts Tournament (M & W)

Junior
Inter-Provincial U-21 Tournament (M, & W)

Other
Varsity Hockey (Varsity Sports)
University Sport South Africa hockey Tournament (USSA)
National Boys and Girls IPT (SASHOC: U-18, U-16,U-13)
Regional Boys and Girls IPT (SASHOC: U-18, U-16, U-14, U-13, U-12)
SA Masters Inter-Provincial Tournament (South African Masters Hockey)

Indoor
Indoor Inter-Provincial Tournament (M & W)

See also
South Africa men's national field hockey team
South Africa women's national field hockey team
South Africa men's national under-21 field hockey team
South Africa women's national under-21 field hockey team
South Africa men's national under-18 field hockey team
South Africa women's national under-18 field hockey team
African Hockey Federation

References

External links
 Official Website
 South African hockey revolution hits all the targets

 
National members of the African Hockey Federation
Field hockey